I Divide are a British rock band from Exeter. They released their debut album titled Last One Standing on 14 April 2014

History

2011-14: Early years and What's Worth More
The band was formed in 2011 in Exeter, England with original members; Kristen Hughes, Dave Mooney, Tom Kavanagh, Henry Selley and Josh Wreford.

They released their first mini album, titled 'What's Worth More', the same year in October independently. After the release, the band entered the Red Bull 'Bedroom Jam' tenement in early 2014, and in April, the band won the tournament, making them the 12th band to do so. Later that year, the band was announced as a support act for Funeral for a Friend's UK tour during January and February 2013. The band signed to 'Destroy Everything Records' in March 2013 when the label itself was announced.

2014-present: Last One Standing
The band announced their debut album in February 2014, where they revealed the album's title, 'Last One Standing', its artwork, its track listing and its release date, being 14 April the same year. In March and early April, the band supported post-hardcore band Yashin on their UK tour.

Before 'Last One Standing' was released, it was made available for streaming online one week prior. When the album was finally released, it entered the UK's top 40 Rock and Metal albums chart at 34. After the album's release, the band toured with British rock band Blitz Kids as a support act in support of the release.

Members
Kristen Hughes – bass
Dave Mooney – drums
Tom Kavanagh – lead vocals
Henry Selley – guitar
Josh Wreford – guitar, backing vocals

Discography

Albums

Studio albums

Mini albums

Singles

Music videos

References

Musical groups established in 2011
British post-hardcore musical groups
2011 establishments in England